Contemporary British Painting is an artists' collective of over 60 members, founded in 2013 by Robert Priseman with the assistance of Simon Carter. It is a platform for contemporary painting in the UK "seeking to explore and promote critical context and dialogue in current painting practice through a series of solo and group exhibitions; talks, publications and an art prize". ‘Contemporary British Painting’ also facilitates the donation of paintings to art collections, galleries and museums in the UK and around the world.

History

In 2013 British artist and curator Robert Priseman developed a series of solo painting exhibitions for the Crypt in St Marylebone Parish Church in collaboration with The Revd Canon Stephen Evans (Rector of St Marylebone) and artist Simon Carter. The aim of the project was to explore themes from the perspective of practicing painters which held a particular 21st century resonance. Following the initial programme of solo exhibitions at the crypt a group drawn from the exhibited painters formed an advisory board. Out of this, a series of group exhibitions was developed along with a series of talks, reading groups and the donation of paintings by members of the group to art collections, galleries and museums in the UK and around the world. This was further enabled through the formation of an external advisory board including members Michael Peppiatt (owner and publisher of Art International 1985-1995 and board member of the Palazzo delle Esposizioni, Rome), Amanda Geitner (Senior Curator of the  Sainsbury Centre for Visual Arts, 1998-2015 and Director East Anglian Art Fund), Professor Rebecca Fortnum (Director of Graduate Studies in Fine Art Middlesex University and Dr Lisa Wade (Head of Department, Arts and Humanities, University Campus Suffolk).

In 2014 ‘Contemporary British Painting’ launched ‘Painting of the Day’, a platform for artists to submit images of their paintings, with those selected being featured on the groups social media platforms in ‘Painting of the day’ at 11.00am each day. This was followed in 2015 by the development of a monthly ‘Reading Group’ for painters in collaboration with Westminster Art Library and The Minories, Colchester and a painting prize which was launched in 2016.

The Contemporary British Painting Prize 
‘The Contemporary British Painting Prize’, was launched in 2016 and is open to artists of any age and nationality living and working in the UK. The winner is awarded a solo exhibition at Swindon Art Gallery, a £2,000 purchase prize of their painting which enters the ‘Priseman Seabrook Collection of 21st Century British Painting’ and a critical essay on their practice. Shortlisted artists participate in a group show at The Riverside Gallery, Museum of Richmond, London and Huddersfield Art Gallery.

Selected group exhibitions

(2017) Anything Goes? Art Bermondsey Project Space, London
(2016) Contemporary British Painting: Summer Show, The Quay Arts, Isle of Wight, UK
(2016) Slippery and Amorphous, The Crypt, St Marylebone Parish Church, London
(2015) Lines for Agnes, The Crypt, St Marylebone Parish Church, London
(2015) Brentwood Stations of the Cross, Brentwood Cathedral, Essex, UK
(2014) Contemporary British Painting, Huddersfield Art Gallery, Huddersfield, UK
(2014) @paintbritian, Ipswich Art School Galleries, Ipswich Museum, Ipswich, UK

Members 

Artist members include: David Ainley, Iain Andrews, Amanda Ansell, Claudia Böse, Julian Brown, Simon Burton, Simon Carter, Lucy Cox, Jules Clarke, Andrew Crane, Pen Dalton, Lisa Denyer, Annabel Dover, Natalie Dowse, Nathan Eastwood,  Terry Greene, Susan Gunn, Susie Hamilton, Alex Hanna, Marguerite Horner, Phil Illingworth,
Linda Ingham, Matthew Krishanu, Andrew Litten, Cathy Lomax, Paula MacArthur, Nicholas Middleton, Stephen Newton, Mandy Payne, Alison Pilkington, Narbi Price, James Quin, Greg Rook, Wendy Saunders, Stephen Snoddy, Judith Tucker, Mary Webb and Sean Williams.

Selected publications
Priseman. R. (2017) Contemporary Masters from Britain. 
Purdue. F. (2016) Contemporary British Painting Summer Exhibition 2016. 
Priseman. R., Cummings. S. & O'Kane. P. (2015) Documentary Realism: Painting in the Digital Age. 

Carter. S. (2014) @paintbritain: 45 Contemporary Painters.

References

External links
 Contemporary British Painting

British artist groups and collectives
Arts organisations based in the United Kingdom